Keith Ovenden (born 1943) is an English novelist and biographer.

Ovenden was born and raised in London; he was educated at Wanstead County High School. He went on to study for degrees at the University of Keele (United Kingdom), University of Michigan (United States) and the University of Oxford.

Keith Ovenden started his career lecturing at the University of Essex in the Department of Government. Since then he has lived abroad in New Zealand, France, and the United States, writing books. He is currently based in Wellington, New Zealand.

Ovenden is married to Helen Sutch, daughter of William Ball Sutch and Shirley Smith.

Books

Academic
 Apartheid and International Finance: A Programme for Change, Penguin, 1989. (With Tony Cole.)

Novels
 Ratatui, 1984.
 O.E., 1986.
 The Greatest Sorrow, Penguin, 1998. . (Set in Oxford.)
 Quick Bright Things, Hamish Hamilton, 2000. 

Biography
 A Fighting Withdrawal: The Life of Dan Davin – Writer, Soldier, Publisher, Oxford University Press (1996). 
 Bill & Shirley: A memoir, Massey University Press (2020).

References

1943 births
Living people
University of Michigan alumni
Alumni of the University of Oxford
Alumni of Keele University
20th-century English novelists
20th-century English male writers
English biographers
Academics of the University of Essex
English male novelists
English male non-fiction writers
Male biographers
English expatriates in New Zealand